Ma Zhu (馬注) (1640 – after 1710) was a Chinese Hanafi-Maturidi scholar. Ma was noted for his combining of Confucian and Islamic values in his philosophy.

Biography 
Ma was born in Yongchang Fu in Yunnan Province during the reign of the Qing dynasty. His father died when Ma was young. He is claimed to be a descendant of Ajall Shams al-Din Omar, a Muslim Mongol general, and of the Prophet Mohammed.

Philosophy 
Ma Zhu's philosophy focused heavily on social relations and interactions between the sexes. He theorized that, per Confucian and Islamic values, an ideal society would be one in which men dominated public affairs while women would serve in a subservient role as domestic helpmates. The philosopher opposed women performing roles outside of the home, stating "even a talented woman should not take care of non-domestic affairs". Ma took inspiration for his ideal role for women from the story of Adam and Eve, in which Allah created Eve from the flesh of Adam. This indicated to Ma that men and women were not intended to be of equal standing in society. Ma wrote:

Ma's philosophy also denoted the distinctions between the traditional Chinese paired forces of ming and xing, and yin and yang. According to Ma, ming represented what was preordained by Allah, while xing represented by what was acquirable though social conditioning and exposure to earthly human existence. Similarly, in Ma's view yin represented the earthly acquired and yang represented the divinely innate. Parts from both were required to form any human. Ma also believed that women should strive to be similar to famous women in Islam, he mentioned Moleyan (Maryam), Khadiyah, and Fatima as examples to follow.

Ma also advocated for both men and women to pursue an Islamic education.

See also 
 Wang Daiyu
 Yusuf Ma Dexin
 Liu Zhi (scholar)
 List of Hanafis
 List of Ash'aris and Maturidis
 List of Muslim theologians

References 

17th-century Chinese writers
Chinese Muslims
Hanafis
Maturidis
17th-century Muslim theologians
Shaykh al-Islāms
Sunni imams
Sunni Muslim scholars of Islam
1640 births
1711 deaths
18th-century Muslim theologians
17th-century Chinese translators